The War in Space, released in Japan as , is a tokusatsu science fiction film produced and released by Toho Studios in 1977.

Plot
In Autumn of the year 1988, contact with Space Station Terra is lost while sightings of UFOs are being reported all over America. A follow-up investigation headed by UN scientist Professor Schmidt (William Ross) and his men is started to look into the  strange reports. The space station crew manage to report to the Japanese branch of the UN Space Federation that a large  “roman galleon” has appeared and all communication with Terra is cut.

UN team member Miyoshi (Kensaku Morita) visits world-renowned Professor Takigawa (Ryō Ikebe) and tells him that the UN is ordering him to complete construction of the space defense unit he created, Gohten, so that they use it to fight back the invaders. But he refuses saying that the project was disbanded three years ago when there were fears of an alien invasion of Earth. Miyoshi asks him why the UN-ordered space defense unit was forcefully disbanded. He tells him that it became unimportant. Professor Takigawa then gets a call from the Japanese branch that Professor Schmidt was killed by something when he was in the mountains investigating the UFO landings. Takigawa still refuses and Miyoshi leaves. Additionally, Miyoshi is in love with Takigawa's daughter June Takigawa (Yuko Asano), who is engaged with fellow UN team member Muroi (Masaya Oki).

While leaving, Miyoshi and Muroi along with Fuyuki (Hiroshi Miyauchi) see Professor Schmidt drive up to Takigawa's house, when he was reported dead. Takigawa lets him in and Schmidt tells him that his death was a rumor. He too tells Takigawa to complete the Gohten as soon as possible. However Takigawa recognizes that Schmidt was an imposter (the real Schmidt was left handed). Miyoshi and his  friends chase after the alien Schmidt but he blows himself up before they could get him. They discover the alien was wearing a latex mask of the dead Schmidt.

After hearing of the incident, the UN puts Commander Oshi (Akihiko Hirata) in charge of the defense forces. Takigawa is then ordered to complete construction of Gohten. It is also discovered that the aliens have set up a base on the planet Venus. Meanwhile, the UFOs launch a full-scale attack on earth's cites, including New York City, London, Paris, Moscow, and San Francisco. While the attack was happening, the Gohten team take a submarine and makes it to the island where the spaceship is housed. One of the Gohten's crew, NASA scientist Jimmy (David Palen) makes it to the island but not before getting shot down by one of the many UFOs attacking the island. The Gohten is completed, however aliens infiltrate that base and try to take Takigawa away with them. Murrei, Jimmy and Miyoshi kill the aliens before they can kidnap Takigawa. They launch the Gohten to do battle with the UFOs and the space warship takes them all out with little trouble.

The Gohten then heads into space towards Venus where the alien HQ is located. During the journey, Muroi asks Miyoshi to take care of June if something should happen to him. They come across the wreckage of space station Terra and Muroi goes out to investigate it. There, he finds the body of one of Terra's crew, Mikasa, which is brought abroad the Gohten. However, it is discovered that Mikasa is an alien in disguise. The alien kidnaps June and escapes with her on a UFO.

While the crew of the Gohten chase after the UFO they receive a message from Venus. The message is a warning from Commander Hell (Goro Mutsumi) the self-proclaimed Emperor of the Galaxy.  He tells them that he and his race hail from the third planet of the Yomi system in the Messier 13 nebula, 22,000 light years from our solar system. Takigawa then asks him why they want to take over Earth. Commander Hell tells him that their planet has died and that they need a new planet to live on. He then warns them that if they attack they will all die.

The Gohten makes it to Venus and Miyoshi, Muroi and Jimmy use a small lander to find the alien spaceship. They find the enemy spaceship (later named the Daimakan) in a large cave with a force field around it. They take pictures of it, but are nearly killed by the Daimakan's lasers.

Back on the Gohten, it is discovered that there is an air duct in the alien base that they can sneak into. Miyoshi, Fuyuki and several crewmen go out in the lander to get on board the Daimakan, while Muroi, Jimmy and other pilots try to destroy the spaceship's force field with their space fighters while also fending off UFOs. Jimmy sacrifices himself by destroying the force field. Miyoshi and the others sneak inside the base and suffer heavy losses. Miyoshi is successful in rescuing June, but not before battling and defeating the Space Beastman (most likely an animal from the alien homeworld). They make it back to the Gohten, but Muroi does not.

The Gohten and the Daimakan go head-to-head in a mid-air showdown. Just when it seems the Gohten has the superior firepower, the Daimakan fires a large energy beam it had hidden under its frontal cannons. The Gohten becomes crippled by the energy beam and crashes on the Venusian surface.

While crew members repair the ship, Takigawa goes into the ship's drill-bow. When Miyoshi and June return to the control room they find a tape recording made by Takigawa. He tells them that while building the Gohten, he discovered how to make a bomb so powerful, that it could blow up a planet. That was why he didn't want to launch the Gohten and why the aliens wanted him. He detached the drill from the Gohten with him inside and launched it into the Daimakan, causing it to crash into an active volcano. That in turn causes a chain reaction all over Venus. The rest of the Gohten, piloted by Miyochi and June head back to Earth just before Venus is destroyed.

Cast
 Kensaku Morita as Koji Miyoshi, Duty Officer, United Nations Space Bureau
 Yuko Asano as June Takigawa, United Nations
 Masaya Oki as Reisuke Muroi, Flight Instructor, Japan Air Self Defense Forces
 Ryō Ikebe as Masato Takigawa, Doctor of Space Engineering, Commander of UNSF Goten
 Katsutoshi Arata as Tadashi　Mikasa, Crewmember, Space Station Terra
 Hiroshi Miyauchi as Kazuo Fuyuki, Japan Air Self Defense Forces
 David Palen as Jimmy, Space Fighter Pilot, United Nations Space Forces
 Takashi Kanematsu as Tetsuo Kusaka, Japan Air Self Defense Forces
 Futoshi Kikuchi as Goro Minato, Japan Air Self Defense Forces
 Hideji Otaki as Dr. Matsuzawa, Director of United Nations Space Bureau, Japan Branch
 Akihiko Hirata as Commander Oishi, Japan Defence Forces
 William Ross as Dr. Schmitt/Commander Hell
 Toshikazu Moritagawa as Ishiyama, UNSF Goten Gunnery Group Leader
 Gorō Mutsumi as Heru, Commander-in-Chief of Planet Yomi Expeditionary Forces
 Isao Hashimoto as Scientist A, United Nations Space Forces, Japan Branch
 Go Endo as Scientist B, United Nations Space Forces, Japan Branch
 Shoji Nakayama as Staff Officer, Japan Self Defense Forces Headquarters
 Wataru Yamamoto as UNSF Goten Pilot
 Yu Naoki as UNSF Goten Co-pilot
 Yosuke Takemura as UNSF Goten Communications Officer A
 Shinichi Yoshimiya as UNSF Goten Communications Officer B
 Shinji Kawabata as UNSF Goten Bridge Officer A
 Koichi Yoshida as UNSF Goten Bridge Officer B
 Fumitsugu Hayata as UNSF Goten Bridge Officer C
 Junichi Eto as UNSF Goten Crew Member A
 Osamu Murashima as UNSF Goten Crew Member B
 Susumu Ootani as UNSF Goten Crew Member C
 Isao Setoyama as UNSF Goten Radar Officer
 Mammoth Suzuki as the Space Beast

Production

Writing
While the concept and production of The War in Space was spurred by the international success of Star Wars, the film is actually an outer space redressing of Toho's undersea adventure Atragon and the groundbreaking anime series Space Battleship Yamato. The War in Space was originally announced as a sequel to Battle in Outer Space. Design-wise, the UNSF Gohten is a cross between the Space Battleship Yamato and the Gotengo.

DVD release
A DVD of the film was released in the United States on April 25, 2006 with both English and Japanese soundtracks. Included on the disc was an interview with special effects director for the film, Teruyoshi Nakano.

References

External links
 The War in Space (review) at tohokingdom.com
 
 

1977 films
1970s science fiction war films
1970s monster movies
Films directed by Jun Fukuda
Films set in 1988
Japanese science fiction films
Fiction set around Messier 13
Space adventure films
Toho tokusatsu films
Discotek Media
1970s Japanese-language films
1970s Japanese films